Hazal Filiz Küçükköse (born 9 February 1988) is a Turkish actress.

Life and career
Hazal completed high school education in Ankara. Küçükköse, who studied at the Department of Biology at the Kırıkkale University Science and Literature Faculty until the third semester, is now continuing her undergraduate studies at the Department of Chemistry at Ankara University Science Faculty. Küçükköse stated that she was discovered by a cast director who saw her photos by chance at a social networking site and that her acting career began with her participation in actor selections. Küçükköse said, "I found myself in front of the camera while preparing for the general biology visa."

Filmography

Awards and nominations

References

External links
 

1988 births
Living people
21st-century Turkish actresses